Wolf Wajsbrot (3 March 1925 – 21 February 1944) was a member of the French Resistance under the Nazi occupation. He was born in the Polish town of Kraśnik. His parents moved to France shortly after his birth due to increasing anti-semitism and a worsening economic climate, eventually settling in Paris.

In 1939, the year Germany invaded Poland and war was declared, Wajsbrot gained his school leaving certificate and began training to be a mechanic. Following the Nazi occupation of Paris, Wajsbrot's parents were arrested in the Vel' d'Hiv Roundup (Rafle du Vel' d'Hiv) on 16 July 1942 and deported. Wajsbrot joined the Communist resistance group Francs-tireurs et partisans - Main-d'œuvre immigrée (FTP-MOI) shortly afterwards and proved to be a key participant in the violent actions they brought against the occupiers. Six days after his eighteenth birthday, Wajsbrot threw a grenade into a train carriage reserved for German soldiers, causing "undescribable damage" according to an eye-witness.

By mid-1943, the Germans had begun to close in on the FTP-MOI. Following the capture of one of the group's leaders and the subsequent information gained from his torture, the remaining the members of his cell (Wajsbrot among them) were captured in November 1943. Between his capture and subsequent trial in February of the following year, Wajsbrot was interrogated and tortured. After a one-day trial, he was condemned to death. On the afternoon of 21 February 1944, still just eighteen years old, Wajsbrot was executed at Mont Valérien, in a suburb of Paris.

Wajsbrot's photograph was one of ten featuring on the Affiche Rouge, the iconic Nazi propaganda poster describing the FTP as an "army of crime".

He is buried in the Parisian cemetery of Ivry under the words Mort pour la France.

References

Bibliography
  Les Jeunes et la Résistance, dir. Laurence Thibault, AERI/La Documentation Française, 2007
  L'Affiche rouge, Adam Rayski Mairie de Paris, 2003
  La Résistance en Ile-de-France, DVD-Rom, AERI, 2004
  Le Sang de l'étranger - Les immigrés de la M.O.I. dans la Résistance, S. Courtois, D. Peschanski, A. Rayski, Fayard, 1989

External links 
  "Wolf Wajsbrot" United States Holocaust Memorial Museum, May 20, 2008 
    La journée d'un "Terroriste" (Daily life of a "terrorist") 
  Discussion between d'André Santini and Henry Karayan

1925 births
1944 deaths
People from Kraśnik
Jews in the French resistance
Members of the Francs-tireurs et partisans
Affiche Rouge
Resistance members killed by Nazi Germany
People executed by Germany by firearm
French people executed by Nazi Germany
Polish people executed by Nazi Germany
Deaths by firearm in France
Executed people from Lublin Voivodeship
Polish emigrants to France